Morad Saghafi (born 1957 in Tehran) is an Iranian journalist, political analyst, and activist. Saghafi is the editor of Goft-o-Gu (means Dialogue), a journal of research and opinion published in Tehran.
Goft-o-Gu had an important role in explaining the theoretical concepts of civil society in Iran.

Arrest
On 15 March 2017, he was arrested during a crackdown on journalists, according to the ILNA news agency.

Selected works
The author has published several acclaimed articles including Why Iran Seems So Unpredictable. and the following:

References

External links
 Goft-o-Gu Official Website
 Why Iran Seems So Unpredictable by Morad Saghafi
 DW News
 Arrest information

Iranian journalists
Iranian writers
Iranian democracy activists
People from Tehran
1957 births
Living people
Persian-language writers